Frédéric Bintsamou (born 29 August 1964, Brazzaville) also known as Pastor Ntumi, is a Protestant clergyman and was the leader of the "semi-religious" rebel group The Ninjas which led a civil war in Congo-Brazzaville.

In April 2007, Bintsamou signed a peace agreement with the central government in Brazzaville.  Under the agreement, Bintsamou was to disband his militia in exchange for a position as a deputy minister responsible for peace and reparations.

Bintsamou was eventually installed in his official post as Delegate-General for the Promotion of the Values of Peace and Repair of the Ravages of War on 28 December 2009.

Standing as a candidate of his party, the Conseil National des Républicains (CNR), Bintsamou was elected as a local councilor in Mayama, located in the Pool Department, in the September 2014 local elections.

References

Living people
Republic of the Congo rebels
Republic of the Congo clergy
Republic of the Congo Protestants
Republic of the Congo politicians
People from Brazzaville
1964 births